The  was a major theatre in the Kabukichō, Shinjuku, Tokyo. The theatre opened in 1956 and it had a capacity of 2,088 seats.

Past shows 
Kōhaku Uta Gassen (1958)
Saburō Kitajima
Ken Matsudaira
Hibari Misora
Kiyoshi Hikawa
Sachiko Kobayashi
Nana Mizuki (2008)
Momoe in Koma (1977)
Kasou Taishou (1979)
Annie Get Your Gun
How to Succeed in Business Without Really Trying
South Pacific
Peter Pan
We Will Rock You

External links 
Koma Stadium website

Theatres completed in 1956
Former theatres in Japan
2008 disestablishments in Japan
Buildings and structures in Shinjuku
1956 establishments in Japan
Buildings and structures demolished in 2009
Demolished buildings and structures in Japan
Theatres in Tokyo